Christopher Frederick Andrews (born 15 October 1942) is an English-German singer-songwriter whose musical career started in the late 1950s.

Career
Andrews was born in Romford, Essex, England, and by his mid teens had formed his own group, Chris Ravel and the Ravers. On 14 March 1959, he made his British television debut, performing on the Oh, Boy! show. He would later return in April to perform a cover of Cliff Richard's, "Move It".

For Adam Faith, Andrews wrote "The First Time" (No. 5 on the UK Singles Chart, 1963) and "We Are in Love" (No. 11, 1964), and then a string of hits for Sandie Shaw. They included "Girl Don't Come" (No. 3, 1964/65), "I'll Stop at Nothing" (No. 4, 1965), "Message Understood" (No. 6, 1965) and "Long Live Love" (No. 1, 1965). The latter remained a chart topper in the UK Singles Chart for three weeks. "Girl Don't Come" was covered by Cher on her debut album, All I Really Want to Do.

Also in 1965, Andrews as a solo artist, got to No. 3 in the same listings with "Yesterday Man", which peaked in Germany at No. 1 for four weeks; followed up with a No. 13 hit in the UK "To Whom It Concerns". The instrumental section of this song was used as the theme for RTÉ's long-running TV programme, The Late Late Show, until 1999, and a re-arranged version returned as the show's theme music in September 2009. As well as obtaining a high placing in the UK chart, "Yesterday Man" climbed to No. 1 in Ireland and Germany. It sold over one million copies, and was awarded a gold disc. Later releases were not as successful, but his own hits are seen as early examples of bluebeat influenced white pop music. Although his chart appearances dwindled in Britain by 1966, his chart topping success continued in mainland Europe for a number of years, particularly in Germany, and Andrews often recorded in foreign languages. It is possible that Chris Andrews' huge success in Germany was connected to the fact that his two UK hits, at least, were rhythmically redolent of Oom-pah music (although not intentionally so; see above), thus making them more acceptable to older German audiences who would not have liked many of the other Anglophone songs which became hits there.

In South Africa, his later single releases proved particularly popular, with "Pretty Belinda" (1969), "Carol OK" and "Brown Eyes" (both 1970) all topping the charts there. "Yo Yo" reached No. 7 at the end of 1970.

Andrews remains active in his career as a singer-songwriter, working primarily in continental Europe and in the United Kingdom. He lives with his second wife Alexandra, who is also his manager, in Selm, Germany, and Mallorca. Because of the Brexit vote, Andrews also obtained German citizenship in 2016.

Songwriting credits
"To Whom It Concerns" – Keith
"As Long as You're Happy Baby" – Sandie Shaw
"Come Closer" – Adam Faith
"Don't Run Away" – Sandie Shaw
"The First Time" – Adam Faith
"Girl Don't Come" – Sandie Shaw
"Heart of Stone" – Suzi Quatro
"Here's Another Day" – Adam Faith
"How Can You Tell" – Sandie Shaw
"I'll Remember Tonight" – The Mamas & the Papas
"I'll Stop at Nothing" – Sandie Shaw
"Long Live Love" – Sandie Shaw
"Message Understood" – Sandie Shaw
"Nothing Comes Easy" – Sandie Shaw
"Nothing Less than Brilliant" – Sandie Shaw
"Run" – Sandie Shaw
"Show Me" – Sandie Shaw
"Think It All Over" – Sandie Shaw
"Think Sometimes About Me" – Sandie Shaw
"Today" – Sandie Shaw
"Tomorrow" – Sandie Shaw
"We Are in Love" – Adam Faith
"You Don't Love Me" – The Roulettes
"You've Not Changed" – Sandie Shaw

Discography

Singles

See also
List of artists under the Decca Records label
Number 1 Singles in Ireland 1965
List of artists who reached number one in Ireland
Number-one hits of 1966 (Germany)
List of performances on Top of the Pops

References

External links

Official website

1942 births
Living people
People from Romford
Musicians from Essex
English songwriters
English male singer-songwriters
English record producers
English expatriates in Germany
20th-century German male singers
Decca Records artists
Atco Records artists
British male songwriters